Tadeu may refer to:

José Tadeu Carneiro Cardoso (born 1956), aka Mestre Camisa, Capoeira master who created the organization ABADÁ-Capoeira
Tadeu Hasdeu or Bogdan Petriceicu Hasdeu (1838–1907), Romanian writer and philologist
Tadeu Jesus Nogueira, Jr. (born 1981), Brazilian footballer commonly known as Juninho
Tadeu Jungle (born 1956), Brazilian multimedia artist
Tadeu (footballer, born 1986), full name José Tadeu Mouro Júnior, Brazilian football forward
Tadeu (footballer, born 1992), full name Tadeu Antônio Ferreira, Brazilian football goalkeeper
Ely Tadeu Bravin Rangel (born 1982), Brazilian football forward commonly known as Ely Thadeu
Tadeu Schmidt, host of Fantástico, a Brazilian weekly television newsmagazine
Gilmar Tadeu da Silva (born 1970),  Brazilian football manager and former football player commonly known as Gil Paulista
Ygor Tadeu De Souza (born 1986), Brazilian striker who has recently played for Chengdu Blades in the China League One
Tarcisio Tadeu Spricigo, Brazilian Roman Catholic priest jailed for 14 years for sexual abuse of children 
Eugenio Tadeu, Brazilian grappler, Vale Tudo and mixed martial arts fighter
Tadeu Terra (born 1986), Brazilian footballer who is currently without a club

See also
Esporte Clube São Judas Tadeu, Brazilian men's and women's football club based in Jaguariúna, São Paulo state
Universidade São Judas Tadeu (USJT), a Brazilian private, for-profit university based in São Paulo
Tadateru
Tadeusz (disambiguation)
Tardieu (disambiguation)